Nelson Antonio Tapia Ríos (born 22 September 1966) is a former Chilean football goalkeeper and current football manager of Ecuadorian club Olmedo.

International career
He made his debut for the Chile national team in 1994 against France. After his last match thus far, a 0–5 loss against Brazil in 2005, the tally is at 73 caps. He played all four games for Chile at the 1998 FIFA World Cup, and he also won an Olympic bronze medal with Chile at the 2000 Summer Olympics.

Managerial career
While he was studying at the INAF (National Football Institute) to become a football manager, he worked as a goalkeeping coach of C.D. Universidad Católica at under-10 level and as the coach of the Molina football team, in his birthplace. In addition to this, he worked as coach at school and university level and as the Technical Director of both Unión Temuco and Colchagua. In 2015, he worked as a goalkeeping coach of Chile U17 and next he became the manager of Independiente de Cauquenes in the third category of the Chilean football.

After a time as an assistant coach in Cobreloa, in 2019 he moved to Ecuador and joined Barcelona S.C. as a goalkeeping coach. Next he joined Guayaquil Sport as manager, winning the 2020 Segunda Categoría. In 2021 season, he won again the same title along with Libertad FC Tapia was sacked by Libertad on 22 September 2022.

In February 2023, he switched to Olmedo in the Serie B.

Personal life
He is nicknamed Simpson because during his career he wore a hair style similar to cartoon character Bart Simpson.

Honours

Player

Club
Universidad Católica
 Copa Interamericana (1): 1994 Copa Interamericana
 Copa Chile (1): 1995 Copa Chile

Cobreloa
 Primera División de Chile (2): 2003 Apertura, 2003 Clausura

Santos
 Serie A (1): 2004

International
 Olympic Games:  in Sydney 2000

Manager
Guayaquil Sport
 Segunda Categoría (1): 2020

Libertad
 Segunda Categoría (1): 2021

References

External links

international career details at rsssf

1966 births
Living people
People from Curicó Province
Chilean footballers
Association football goalkeepers
Chile international footballers
Footballers at the 2000 Summer Olympics
1998 FIFA World Cup players
1999 Copa América players
2001 Copa América players
Olympic footballers of Chile
Olympic bronze medalists for Chile
Chilean Primera División players
Argentine Primera División players
Campeonato Brasileiro Série A
Categoría Primera A players
O'Higgins F.C. footballers
Deportes Temuco footballers
Cobreloa footballers
Club Deportivo Universidad Católica footballers
Club Atlético Vélez Sarsfield footballers
Puerto Montt footballers
Unión Española footballers
Santos FC players
Atlético Junior footballers
Olympic medalists in football
Medalists at the 2000 Summer Olympics
Chilean expatriate footballers
Expatriate footballers in Argentina
Chilean expatriate sportspeople in Argentina
Expatriate footballers in Brazil
Chilean expatriate sportspeople in Brazil
Expatriate footballers in Colombia
Chilean expatriate sportspeople in Colombia
Chilean football managers
Barcelona S.C. managers
Libertad F.C. (Ecuador) managers
C.D. Olmedo managers
Chilean expatriate football managers
Expatriate football managers in Ecuador
Chilean expatriate sportspeople in Ecuador